Rotherfield Greys is a village and civil parish in the Chiltern Hills in South Oxfordshire. It is linked by a near-straight minor road to Henley.

History
The Domesday Book of 1086 mentions Rotherfield Greys under the ownership of the Normans knight Anchetil de Greye and in a period when the county was administered in hundreds, in Binfield Hundred. Rotherfield derives from the Old English redrefeld meaning "cattle lands". Around 1347, a castle was built at Rotherfield Greys; it is now in ruins.  The parish church includes the 16th-century Knollys Chapel, which houses an ornate tomb of the Knollys family. This includes effigies of Sir Francis Knollys and his wife, who was lady-in-waiting to Queen Elizabeth I.

Amenities
The Church of England parish church of Saint Nicholas is Norman and was restored in 1865. The village has a public house, The Maltsters Arms, which is owned by W.H. Brakspear & Sons. The current landlord is Gary Clarke. French-trained Chef & front man of The Cureheads.

Architecture
In the parish is Greys Court, whose predecessor was the manor house of the Grey family. It is owned and maintained by the National Trust and its Dower House is likewise in the top category of Grade I listed building.  As to other buildings, ruins, and monuments, 31 are listed in the parish for historic or architectural merit, most in the Grade II starting category.

Gallery

References

Sources

External links

A birds-eye view of Greys Court Rotherfield Greys in the 17th or 18th century from SCRAN
Greys Court at Rotherfield
Roll of Honour
Rotherfield Greys Parish Website
UK National Archives — Domesday

Villages in Oxfordshire
Civil parishes in Oxfordshire
Grey family residences